The Fier is a  long river in the Haute-Savoie and Savoie départements, southeastern France. Its source is at Manigod, in the Aravis Range. It flows generally west. It is a left tributary of the Rhône into which it flows at Seyssel.

Among its tributaries are the Chéran and the Thiou, that drains Lake Annecy.

Départements and communes along its course
This list is ordered from source to mouth: 
 Haute-Savoie: Manigod, Les Clefs, Thônes, La Balme-de-Thuy, Alex, Dingy-Saint-Clair, Annecy-le-Vieux, Nâves-Parmelan, Villaz, Argonay, Pringy, Metz-Tessy, Meythet, Annecy, Cran-Gevrier, Poisy, Chavanod, Lovagny, Étercy, Vaulx, Hauteville-sur-Fier, Sales, Vallières, Rumilly, Moye, Lornay, Val-de-Fier, 
 Savoie: Motz
 Haute-Savoie: Seyssel

References

Rivers of France
Rivers of Haute-Savoie
Rivers of Savoie
Rivers of Auvergne-Rhône-Alpes